Anil Agarwal may refer to:

 Anil Agarwal (industrialist) (born 1954), Indian businessman
 Anil Agarwal (environmentalist) (1947–2002), Indian environmentalist
 Anil Agrawal, Indian politician